A dollar van (also known as a jitney) is a privately-owned type of bus service used to carry passengers in the United States. Dollar vans are typically modified passenger vans, and often operate in urban neighborhoods that are under-served by public mass transit or taxis. Some of the dollar vans  are licensed and regulated, while others operate illegally. Passengers may board them at designated stops along their route or hail them as share taxis.

Both common names – dollar van and jitney – originated similarly. Jitney is an archaic term for an American nickel, the common fare for early jitneys. In the late 20th century, when a typical fare was one dollar, the corresponding name came into usage, though "jitney" is still also common.

Dollar vans are often owned and used by members of inner-city communities, such as African/Caribbean American, Latino, and Asian-American populations. Travelers cite cost and greater frequency as factors in choosing jitneys over larger bus service, whereas safety and comfort are cited for choosing buses.

Atlanta
Jitney buses were popular in Atlanta from 1915 to 1925 as an alternative to streetcars.

New York City area

In New York City, dollar vans serve major areas that lack adequate subway service. The vans pick up and drop off anywhere along a route, and payment is made at the end of a trip. During periods when even limited public mass transit is unavailable, such as the January 2005 Green Bus Lines and Command Bus Company strike or the December 2005 New York City transit strike, dollar vans may become the only feasible method of transportation for many commuters. In such situations, city governments may pass legislation to deter price gouging.

Northern New Jersey has a number of companies running dollar vans, often following similar routes to New Jersey Transit buses but at a slightly lower price and greater frequency. The most common routes have an eastern terminus on street level in Manhattan, either near the Port Authority Bus Terminal or the George Washington Bridge Bus Station. Often, several different companies ply the same route.

Miami
In Miami, jitneys (also known as the Miami Mini Bus) run through various neighborhoods, mostly those stretching between Downtown Miami to The Mall at 163rd Street in North Miami Beach, Florida.

San Francisco

San Francisco's Jitneys ran late 1914–January 2016.

See also

 Atlantic City Jitney Association
 Bus
 Hail and ride
 Jeepney
 Marshrutka
 Matatu
 Pesero
 Share taxi

 Van

References

External links
 "Dollar Van". The Big Apple. February 16, 2005
 Joiner, Bryan (January 20, 2005). "Long Stalemate Expected After Union Quits Strike Negotiations". Queens Chronicle.
 Henderson, Christopher (December 22, 2005). "Crowds Overrun LIRR Station While Traffic Crawls In Jamaica". Queens Chronicle
 Wohlwend, Lynn (April 6, 2006). "Council Eyes Color Coding To Make 'Dollar Vans' Safer". Queens Chronicle.
Jitney Buses of New Jersey

Share taxis
Bus transportation in the United States